Imad-Roy El-Amine, known by his stage name Imad Royal, is a Lebanese Canadian electronic R&B singer, producer, and songwriter.

His earlier work includes cuts on #1 albums by The Chainsmokers and Panic! At The Disco’s Grammy-nominated album, “Pray for the Wicked”, where he is credited as a producer on the album’s lead single. He worked heavily on the Birds of Prey soundtrack, including the singles, Doja Cat’s “Boss Bitch” and Charlotte Lawrence’s “Joke’s On You”, MAX’s singles “Love Me Less" (feat. Quinn XCII) and “Blueberry Eyes" (feat. SUGA of BTS) as well as 5 additional songs from his latest album Colour Vision. Recent cuts include "Take it Back" - Jawny ft. Beck, "Proof" - BTS, "Surrender My Heart" - Carly Rae Jepson, and many more

Discography

Singles 

 Troubles (2015)
 Down For Whatever feat. Pell (2016)
 Bad 4 U (2016)
 Queen of France (2019)
 Seeing Red (2020)

EPs  
 Cycles (Octal Sound, 2014)
 Everything Happens (Nice Life, Atlantic, 2017)

Selected songwriting and production credits 

Notes

References

1992 births
Living people
American electronic musicians
American male singer-songwriters
Record producers from Washington, D.C.
Singer-songwriters from Washington, D.C.